Hiradpada is situated in Jawhar tehsil and located in Palghar district of Maharashtra. It is one of 109 villages in Jawhar Block, along with villages like Dabhosa and Sarsun. Nearby railway station of Hiradpada is Thane. Its post office is Jamsar.
The village is famous for waterfall and it is just 0.5 km away from the village. The village is also known for the Adivasi community and their unique culture like dhol nach, tarpa nach and varli painting.

Education

Schools
A. PRI. ASHRAM SHALA, HIRADPADA was established in the year of 2003 and is run by Pvt. Aided Management.  A.PRI.ASHRAM SHALA, HIRADPADA is a Co-Educational and the medium of instruction is/are Marathi language.
Z. P. SCHOOL, HIRADPADA was established in the year of 1977 and is run by Local Body Management.   Z.P.SCHOOL, HIRADPADA is a Co-Educational and the medium of instruction is/are Marathi language.

Villages in Thane district